Wukui or Wugui (died 642 BC), was for three months in early 642 BC ruler of the State of Qi during the Spring and Autumn period of ancient China.  His personal name was Lü Wúkuī (呂無虧) or Lü Wúguǐ (呂無詭), ancestral name Jiang (姜).  Unlike most rulers, he was not given a posthumous title because of his short reign.

Accession to the throne

Wukui's father and predecessor was Duke Huan of Qi, who was the first of the Five Hegemons, the most powerful rulers of the Spring and Autumn period.  Duke Huan had at least three main wives who bore no sons, six favoured concubines, and more than ten sons.  Wukui's mother was the elder Wey Ji, one of the two princesses of the State of Wey who were among Duke Huan's favoured concubines.  However, the crown prince of Qi was Prince Zhao (later Duke Xiao), who was born to Zheng Ji, a princess of the State of Zheng.  Four other sons of Duke Huan also contended for the throne: Prince Pan (later Duke Zhao), Prince Shangren (later Duke Yi), Prince Yuan (later Duke Hui), and Prince Yong.

When Duke Huan died in the tenth month of 643 BC, the six princes fought each other for the throne.  After two months of fighting Wukui prevailed and ascended the throne in the twelfth month.  Crown Prince Zhao fled to the State of Song.  During the unrest Duke Huan's corpse lay unattended for 67 days, and became so badly decomposed that worms crawled out of his room.

Death
Wukui sat on the throne for only three months before being killed.  In the third month of 642 BC, Crown Prince Zhao, the legal heir of Duke Huan, returned with the army of Duke Xiang of Song.  The people of Qi killed Wukui and intended to install Prince Zhao on the throne, but the supporters of the other four princes attacked and drove Prince Zhao back to the State of Song.  Two months later, the Song army returned and defeated the forces of the four princes, and Crown Prince Zhao finally ascended the throne, to be known as Duke Xiao of Qi.

Ancestry

References

Monarchs of Qi (state)
7th-century BC Chinese monarchs
642 BC deaths
Year of birth unknown